Osvaldo Lopes (born 6 April 1980) is a French professional footballer.

He played for his hometown club ES Fréjus, Montpellier HSC and LB Châteauroux in France before joining Plymouth Argyle in August 2002, although his debut was delayed due a delay with his international clearance. He finally made his first team debut on 10 September in a 2-1 League Cup defeat away to Crystal Palace. His league debut came four days later when he replaced Martin Phillips as a second-half substitute in the 1–1 draw away to Barnsley. He was released by Plymouth at the end of the 2002–03 season.

He joined Cork City in September 2004, but made just three substitute appearances before leaving in December 2004. He initially returned to France before returning to England to train with Torquay United. He signed a one-month contract and played for Torquay in the 1–1 draw with Huddersfield Town on 8 January 2005, but this was to be his only game for Torquay before being released later that month.

Within days of his release, he joined Conference North side Kettering Town.

External links

References

1980 births
Living people
Sportspeople from Fréjus
French footballers
Montpellier HSC players
LB Châteauroux players
Plymouth Argyle F.C. players
Cork City F.C. players
League of Ireland players
Torquay United F.C. players
Kettering Town F.C. players
Association football midfielders